is a Japanese taekwondo practitioner. She participated in the 2012 and 2016 Summer Olympics.

References

External links
 
 

1994 births
Japanese female taekwondo practitioners
Taekwondo practitioners at the 2012 Summer Olympics
Taekwondo practitioners at the 2016 Summer Olympics
Olympic taekwondo practitioners of Japan
Taekwondo practitioners at the 2014 Asian Games
Asian Games medalists in taekwondo
Asian Games silver medalists for Japan
People from Saga (city)
People from Saga Prefecture
Living people
Medalists at the 2014 Asian Games
World Taekwondo Championships medalists
Asian Taekwondo Championships medalists
Taekwondo practitioners at the 2020 Summer Olympics
21st-century Japanese women